Sue Rigby  is Professor of paleontology and Vice-Chancellor of Bath Spa University. She is an HEA Principal Fellow and an Honorary Professor at the University of Edinburgh.

Education 
Rigby received her PhD from the University of Cambridge in 1990 for a doctorate on Graptoloid Form and Function. She received a BSc. from the University of Oxford in 1986.

Career 
Rigby was appointed Vice-Chancellor at Bath Spa University in January 2018, succeeding Professor Christina Slade. She receives £209,597.50 per year for her salary. In addition she has elected to receive payment in lieu of pension contributions, currently £39,572 per year. She may also be awarded a bonus of up to £19,200, dependent on performance.

Before taking up the post she was Deputy Vice-Chancellor for Student Development at the University of Lincoln.

Before moving in management in Higher Education, she had previously worked as a Paleontologist at the universities of Cambridge, Leicester and Edinburgh. She was Assistant Principal and then Vice-Principal at the University of Edinburgh.

Rigby is a member of the Teaching Excellence and Student Outcomes Framework (TEF) Panel. She was elected co-convener of the Higher Education Academy's PVC Network in 2016.

She has contributed on an international level to the development of reward and recognition processes for staff in learning and teaching through U21, a global network of research universities, and she developed the first MOOC (massive open online course) to be shared by students in the U21 universities.

Rigby's first employment was writing about exhibitions at the Geological Museum, South Kensington. With C. V. Milson, she co-authored the book Fossils At A Glance (Wiley-Blackwell, 2009). It is the standard textbook for introductory paleontology and has informed the design of the A-level curriculum. It has been translated into four languages.

Rigby's heroine is the paleontologist Gertrude Elles.

She was elected a Fellow of the Royal Society of Edinburgh in 2022.

Publications 
Milsom, C. V. and Rigby, S., (2009) Fossils At A Glance. 2nd ed. Wiley-Blackwell.  

Harper, E. M. and Rigby, S., (2005) 'Palaeoecology' in Selley, R.C, Cocks, R.M and Plimer, I.R, eds. Encyclopedia of geology (Elsevier), pp. 140–7.

References

British palaeontologists
Living people
Year of birth missing (living people)
Vice-Chancellors of Bath Spa University
Alumni of the University of Cambridge
Alumni of the University of Oxford
People associated with the University of Edinburgh
Fellows of the Royal Society of Edinburgh